The SWAC women's basketball tournament is the conference championship tournament in women's basketball for the Southwestern Athletic Conference. It is a single-elimination tournament involving 8 of the 10 league schools, and seeding is based on regular-season records with head-to-head match-up as a tie-breaker. The winner has received the conference's automatic bid to the NCAA women's basketball tournament since 1994.

The highest seeds face off against the corresponding lowest seeds, with the two remaining teams facing off in the Finals to determine the champion.

The tournament has been held since 1981.

Results

List of championships by school

See also
 SWAC men's basketball tournament
 SIAC women's basketball tournament

References